This is a list of the 81 members of the European Parliament for West Germany in the 1979 to 1984 session.

List

References

Germany
List
1979